Stephen Melvin Hokuf (September 26, 1910 – July 1, 2000) was an American football player and coach.  He played college football at the University of Nebraska and professionally in the National Football League (NFL) as a quarterback and fullback for the Boston Redskins from 1933 to 1935.  Hokuf served as the head football coach at Lafayette College from 1952 to 1957, compiling a record of 25–27.

Prior to his head coaching stint at Lafayette, Hokuf was an assistant football coach at a number of other colleges: Colorado School of Mines, the University of Wyoming, Columbia University and the University of Pittsburgh.  He also coached for the Brooklyn Dodgers of the All-America Football Conference from 1947 to 1948.  Hokuf earned a  master's degree in education at the University of Wyoming and a doctorate in education from Columbia University in 1951.  From 1958 to 1979, he worked in the athletic department at Baltimore Junior College—now Baltimore City Community College—serving as athletic director and coach of football and golf.  Hofuk died of a stroke on July 1, 2000 at his home in the Broadmead Retirement Community located in Cockeysville, Maryland.

Head coaching record

References

External links
 

1910 births
2000 deaths
All-American college men's basketball players
American football ends
American football fullbacks
American football quarterbacks
American men's basketball players
Boston Redskins players
Brooklyn Dodgers (AAFC) coaches
Colorado Mines Orediggers football coaches
Columbia Lions football coaches
Lafayette Leopards football coaches
Nebraska Cornhuskers football players
Nebraska Cornhuskers men's basketball players
Pittsburgh Panthers football coaches
Saint Mary's Pre-Flight Air Devils football coaches
Wyoming Cowboys football coaches
College men's track and field athletes in the United States
Junior college football coaches in the United States
Teachers College, Columbia University alumni
University of Wyoming alumni
People from Wilber, Nebraska
Coaches of American football from Nebraska
Players of American football from Nebraska
Basketball players from Nebraska